Sarah Peirse is a New Zealand actress. She works both on screen and stage, best known for her portrayals of two very different mothers — the kind-hearted yet stricken mother Honora Rieper in Heavenly Creatures, and the disaffected sophisticate Kate in Rain. More recently she appeared as Hilda in Peter Jackson's Hobbit trilogy, as well as The Shannara Chronicles.

Selected filmography

References

Living people
New Zealand film actresses
New Zealand stage actresses
New Zealand television actresses
Year of birth missing (living people)
Helpmann Award winners
20th-century New Zealand actresses
21st-century New Zealand actresses